Dildine Island is an island in the Delaware River in Warren County, New Jersey, near the county's border with Northampton County, Pennsylvania.

References

River islands of New Jersey
Landforms of Warren County, New Jersey
Islands of the Delaware River